Michael Greatrex Coney (28 September 1932 - 4 November 2005) was a British science fiction writer, best known for his novel Hello Summer, Goodbye.

Life
Coney was born in Birmingham, England, on 28 September 1932. As an adult, he worked as an accountant, hotel manager, author and forest ranger. He was manager of the Jabberwock Hotel in Antigua in the West Indies from 1969-1972, and was resident there when his first professional story ("Sixth Sense") was published in the first issue of the short-lived science fiction magazine Vision of Tomorrow in 1969. He relocated to Sidney, British Columbia in 1972, spending the latter half of his life in Canada. He worked as a forest ranger for the British Columbia Forest Service from 1973 to 1989, when he retired. He died at the age 73 of pleural mesothelioma, a cancer of the lining of the lungs, on 4 November 2005, at the Saanich Peninsula Hospital palliative care unit.

Works
A common element in Coney's work is that of ordinary people buffeted by forces beyond their strength, and mostly not much concerned with them. Most SF gives superior power to the main characters or has them acquire it during the course of the tale. Coney satirised it in The Hero of Downways.

The stories also relate to the cultural concerns of the time. His first novel, Mirror Image (1972), intensified the American genre's Cold War emphasis on impostors and secret invaders; in this case, the "amorphs", who are indistinguishable from terrestrials, are themselves convinced that they are human.

After a first group of dystopian tales, Coney began to change his themes. His later works The Celestial Steam Locomotive and Gods of the Greataway could almost be set on a transfigured Vancouver Island.

Another of Coney's themes concerns small isolated communities, as in The Hero of Downways, Winter's Children and Fang, the Gnome. In Syzygy the inhabitants of a small town, a fairly recent settlement on an alien planet, struggle to survive the hidden dangers of the planet's ecosystem; in Brontomek! the same characters a few years later face a wholly human threat.

A different perspective is seen in his Hello Summer, Goodbye, an adventure/mystery among people who are not quite human, on a planet rather like Earth, but with significant differences. It is generally agreed to be his best novel. I Remember Pallahaxi, a previously unpublished sequel to Hello Summer, Goodbye, was published posthumously in 2007.

Brontomek! received the British Science Fiction Association award for best novel of 1976. He was nominated for a Nebula Award in 1995 for his novelette "Tea and Hamsters".

Fiction

Novels
 Mirror Image (1972)
 Syzygy (1973)
 Friends Come in Boxes (1973)
 The Hero of Downways (1973)
 Winter's Children (1974)
 Monitor Found in Orbit (1974) (Short story collection)
 The Jaws that Bite, the Claws that Catch (1974; UK title The Girl with a Symphony in her Fingers)
 Hello Summer, Goodbye (UK title, also known  as Rax in USA, and Pallahaxi Tide in Canada;  1975)
 Charisma (1975)
 Brontomek! (1976)
 The Ultimate Jungle (1979)
 Neptune's Cauldron (1981)
 Cat Karina (1982)
 The Celestial Steam Locomotive (1983)
 Gods of the Greataway (1984)
 Fang, the Gnome (1988)
 King of the Scepter'd Isle (1989)
 A Tomcat Called Sabrina (1992)
 No Place for a Sealion (1992
 I Remember Pallahaxi (2007; sequel to Hello Summer, Goodbye — published posthumously)
 Flower of Goronwy (2014; published posthumously)

The Celestial Steam Locomotive and Gods of the Greataway are two parts of a single tale, Cat Karina, Fang, the Gnome and King of the Scepter'd Isle are independent stories set in the same universe. Brontomek! is set on the same world as Syzygy (and has many of the same characters) and is also associated somewhat with Mirror Image and Charisma.

Non-Fiction 
 Forest Ranger, Ahoy! Porthole Press, Sidney BC, 1983.
 Forest Adventure: a guide to the British Columbia Forest Museum. By Gray Campbell and Michael Coney. Porthole Press, Sidney BC, 1985.

Awards and nominations
 British Science Fiction Association Award 1977 for Brontomek!
 Best Novelette Nebula Award 1995 nomination - Tea and Hamsters 
 5 Prix Aurora Award nominations

References

Sources

 Clute, John and Peter Nicholls. The Encyclopedia of Science Fiction. New York: St. Martin's Griffin, 1993 (2nd edition 1995). .

External links
 A bibliography, in PDF
 
 Obituary in the Victoria Times Colonist.
 Obituary in The Guardian
 Obituary by John Clute
 An interview given near the end of his life
 A tribute at Lonely Cry
 The True Worth of Ruth Villiers, a short story by Michael G. Coney, reproduced with permission on Cordula's Web

1932 births
2005 deaths
English science fiction writers
Canadian science fiction writers
Deaths from mesothelioma
People from Birmingham, West Midlands
Writers from British Columbia
Deaths from cancer in British Columbia
20th-century British novelists
English male novelists
20th-century English male writers